Aluminium acetate or aluminium ethanoate (also "aluminum ~"), sometimes abbreviated AlAc in geochemistry, can refer to a number of different salts of aluminum with acetic acid. In the solid state, three salts exist under this name: basic aluminium monoacetate, (HO)2AlCH3CO2, basic aluminium diacetate, HOAl(CH3CO2)2, and neutral aluminium triacetate, Al(CH3CO2)3. In aqueous solution, aluminium triacetate hydrolyses to form a mixture of the other two, and all solutions of all three can be referred to as "aluminium acetate" as the species formed co-exist and inter-convert in chemical equilibrium.

Aluminium monoacetate 

Aluminium monoacetate, also known as dibasic aluminium acetate, forms from Al(OH)3 and dilute aqueous acetic acid. More concentrated acid leads to the di- and triacetate.

Aluminium diacetate 

Aluminium diacetate, also known as basic aluminium acetate, is prepared from aqueous aluminium acetate solution resulting in a white powder. This basic salt forms from the hydrolysis of the triacetate in water.

Aluminium triacetate 

Aluminium triacetate is a chemical compound that is prepared by heating aluminium chloride (AlCl3) or Al powder with a mixture of acetic acid (CH3COOH) and acetic anhydride (C4H6O3). It is referred as the normal salt and is only made in the absence of water at a relatively high temperature like 180 °C.

References

Aluminium compounds
Acetates